The Demon is the third novel by Hubert Selby, Jr., first published in 1976.

Overview
The story of Harry White, a man haunted by lust and an insane need for sin and retribution.

Influence
It was Andy Kaufman’s favorite book and he said of it, “That’s my mind in a nutshell.“

References

External links
Google Books

1976 American novels
Novels by Hubert Selby Jr.